was the forty-sixth of the sixty-nine stations of the Nakasendō connecting Edo with Kyoto in Edo period Japan. It is located in former Mino Province in what is now part of the city of Ena, Gifu Prefecture, Japan. From Ōi-juku to the next post town, Ōkute-juku, there are 13 hills to pass over. Travellers using the Shitakaidō (下街道) often used Ōi-juku, too, as they travelled on to Makiganetsui (槙ヶ根追) afterwards.

History
Ōi-juku is located in the southern foothills of the Japanese Alps, near the banks of the Agi River. It consisted of five sections (named  Yoko-chō, Hon-machi, Tate-machi, Chaya-chō and Hashiba) which were laid out at right angles, forming a pattern similar to that of five  Masugata-style gates typically found on Japanese castles.  While this gave it a very ordered appearance, travelers entering each section of town left that section by a road at a right angle to the entrance, making it very inconvenient and difficult to navigate in a hurry. This was done on purpose to slow down any attacker, as the post station was also a castle town for Iwamura Castle, which dominates a hill overlooking the town.

Parts of Ōi-juku are relatively well-preserved, and several old buildings from the post station have survived to the present day, including one of the hatago and several machiya. However, the honjin was destroyed in 1946 and only the gate and the outside walls now remain. The road itself has preserved its original width and the six Masugata bends are still discernible.

Ōi-juku in The Sixty-nine Stations of the Kiso Kaidō
Utagawa Hiroshige's ukiyo-e print of Ōi-juku dates from 1835 -1838. The print depicts a frigid winter scene, as the area was noted for its heavy snows. Two travelers on horseback and two on foot struggle through the snow, with pine trees on either side denoting the edges of the road. In front are the snow-covered Kiso Mountains and the post station itself is not shown.

Neighboring post towns
Nakasendō
Nakatsugawa-juku - Ōi-juku - Ōkute-juku

References

External links

Hiroshige Kiso-Kaido series
Oi-juku on Kiso Kaido Road
Gifu Nakasendo Guide

Notes

Stations of the Nakasendō
Post stations in Gifu Prefecture
Ena, Gifu
Mino Province